Karen Johnson is an American television soap opera director, producer, writer and editor.

Positions held
All My Children
Writer (January 2008 - March 2008)
 Producer (2004–present)
 Associate Director (1997–2004)
 Editor (1998–2004)

Loving
 Sound Mixing Supervisor (1995)
 Production Assistant (1993–1995)

The City
 Associate Director (entire run, 1995–1997)

Awards and nominations
Daytime Emmy Award
Nomination, 2005, Drama Series, All My Children
Nomination, 2004, Editing, All My Children
Win, 2003, Directing, All My Children
Nomination, 1998, 1999, 2000, 2001, 2002, 2003; Directing, All My Children
Nomination, 2002, Editing, All My Children
Win, 2001, Editing, All My Children
Nomination, 2000, Editing, All My Children
Nomination, 1999, Editing, All My Children

External links

American television producers
American women television producers
American television directors
American soap opera writers
American women television directors
Living people
Soap opera producers
Place of birth missing (living people)
Year of birth missing (living people)
American women television writers
Women soap opera writers
21st-century American women